Eupithecia tshimkentensis is a moth in the family Geometridae first described by Viidalepp in 1988. It is found in the Russian Far East.

The wingspan is 18–21.5 mm. Adults are dark grey.

References

Moths described in 1988
tshimkentensis
Moths of Asia